Salmon River is a small rural community in Digby County, located on the southwest coast of Nova Scotia, Canada.

History

Jacques Deveau and his wife Marie-Madeleine Robichaud were the first Acadian settlers of the community, arriving in the spring of 1786. They returned to the province after the Expulsion of the Acadians in 1755. They were granted 200 acres in Salmon River through a series of land petitions and swaps with a Loyalist family.

Education
The local school is École Saint-Albert from Grade Primary to Grade 6. Grades 7 to 12 are normally sent to nearby École secondaire de Clare.

References

External links
 École Saint-Albert official web site

Communities in Digby County, Nova Scotia